Loren Rowney (born 14 October 1988) is an Australian former racing cyclist. She rode at the 2014 UCI Road World Championships. In October 2015 it was announced that Rowney would join  for the 2016 season after her previous team  disbanded. After five years as a professional in January 2017 Rowney announced that she was retiring from competition after struggling with mental health problems for the previous year.

Major results

2011
 1st  Overall Honda Hybrid Women's Tour
1st  Sprints classification
1st Young rider classification
1st Stage 2
2012
 1st Stage 2 Bay Classic Series
 1st Stage 2 Women's Tour of New Zealand
 1st Stage 1 Redlands Bicycle Classic
 1st Stage 6 La Route de France
2013
 1st Stage 5 Gracia-Orlová
 1st Stage 3 Tour Languedoc Roussillon
 1st Stage 1 (TTT) Belgium Tour
2014
 1st Stage 3 Tour Cycliste Féminin International de l'Ardèche
2015
 1st Stage 4 La Route de France
 1st Stage 5 Trophée d'Or Féminin
 1st  Mountains classification Women's Tour Down Under
 7th Acht van Westerveld
2016
 1st Stage 2 Tour de Feminin-O cenu Českého Švýcarska
 9th Road race, Oceania Road Championships

See also
 2012 Team Specialized–lululemon season
 2013 Specialized–lululemon season
 2014 Specialized–lululemon season

References

External links

1988 births
Living people
Australian female cyclists
Cyclists from Johannesburg